Club Deportivo Social Sol is a Honduran football team based in Olanchito, Yoro.

The club was promoted to the Honduran Liga Nacional for the first time in 2016 and competed in the 2016–17 season.

History
Social Sol was founded on 13 April 1968.  After spending almost 50 years looking for promotion to the top-tier division, they finally earned its right in the 2015–16 season as winners of the Honduran Liga de Ascenso. In their Liga Nacional debut they faced Club Deportivo Olimpia in Tegucigalpa resulting in a 3–2 loss; meanwhile, their first victory occurred on 29 October 2016 when they defeated C.D. Motagua 3–2 at Estadio San Jorge.

Performance by year

Achievements
Liga de Ascenso
Winners (1): 2015–16 A
Runners-up (3): 2004–05 A, 2007–08 C, 2008–09 C

Notable managers
  Carlos Orlando Caballero (2009)

References

 
Football clubs in Honduras
Yoro Department